Tadimarri is a village in Sri Sathya Sai district of the Indian state of Andhra Pradesh. It is the mandal headquarters of Tadimarri mandal in Dharmavaram revenue division.

Geography 
It has an average elevation of 302 metres (994 ft).

Demographics 
According to Indian census, 2001, the demographic details of Tadimarri mandal is as follows:
 Total Population: 	31,731	in 7,329 Households
 Male Population: 	16,259	and Female Population: 	15,472
 Children Under 6-years of age: 3,832	(Boys – 1,985 and Girls – 1,847)
 Total Literates: 	13,932
 Total Aadhaar Cards Issued ( 2014 Feb 13 ) : 26,804 out of 31,731.

References 

Villages in Sri Sathya Sai district
Mandal headquarters in Sri Sathya Sai district